The 121st Fighter Squadron (121 FS) is a unit of the District of Columbia Air National Guard 113th Wing located at Joint Base Andrews, Camp Springs, Maryland. The 121st is equipped with the Block 30 F-16C/D Fighting Falcon.

The squadron is a descendant organization of the 121st Observation Squadron, established on 10 July 1940. It is one of the 29 original National Guard Observation Squadrons of the United States Army National Guard formed before World War II.

Heraldry 
In the early 1960s, the 121st Tactical Fighter Squadron developed and approved a fuselage insignia, an iron fist and jet fighter superimposed on a national shield. It was thought that the unit had no previous insignia, but the designers were incorrect. A Maryland Terrapin originally flew with the District of Columbia Air National Guard and, many years later, was reinstated as the unit's insignia.

The original design, approved in 1943, and authenticated as correct by the Air Museum, Wright-Patterson Air Force Base, is described as follows.

"A caricatured tan and brown turtle proper , riding a "pogo" stick, leaving a trail of hops and impact marks black, all outlined light turquoise blue. Significance: The turtle depicts slow but sure travel, as characterized by the story of the "Tortoise and the Hare" in "Aesop's Fables." The short hops and limited range of liaison airplanes are depicted by the short hops the turtle is making on the pogo stick."

History

Origins 
Established by the National Guard Bureau as the 112th Observation Squadron and allocated to the District of Columbia National Guard in July 1940.   Not organized until April 1941, formed in Washington D. C. without aircraft assigned.

World War II
The unit was ordered to active duty in April 1941 as part of the buildup of the Army Air Corps after the Fall of France.  Assigned to Bolling Field, D.C. and equipped with light observation aircraft. Transferred to the Third Air Force in September 1941, they began flying anti-submarine flights over the South Carolina coastline from airfields in the Columbia area. It was then moved to the First Air Force at Langley Field, Virginia, again engaging in antisubmarine patrols over the Maryland, Virginia and upper North Carolina coasts and the approaches to Chesapeake Bay. Finally, it was moved to Birmingham, Alabama in October 1942 and then inactivated. The squadron personnel were reassigned to other units and aircraft and transferred to other duties.

The squadron was reactivated in April 1943 as a liaison and Observation squadron, with a mission to support Army ground units by flying photo and tactical observation missions, performing battlefield reconnaissance for enemy ground forces, and spotting for artillery fire. They were deployed to the Twelfth Air Force in Algeria in March 1944, engaging in liaison and courier operations for Headquarters, Army Air Forces, MTO. They were equipped with various light observation aircraft, mostly A-20 Havoc light bombers used for aerial photo-reconnaissance and modified A-24 Banshee dive bombers taken out of combat and modified into RA-24 photo-reconnaissance aircraft.

They were again reassigned to the Fifth Army in Italy in September, where they engaged in combat reconnaissance and photo-reconnaissance in Italy as part of the Italian Campaign.  The squadron was then broken up, with elements of the squadron transferred to the Seventh Army in Southern France, where they performed combat reconnaissance as part of the Southern France Campaign. Other parts of the squadron remained attached to the Ninth Air Force and Sixth United States Army Group during the Rhineland Campaign and the Western Allied invasion of Germany.  The remaining elements of the squadron stayed in Italy as part of the Fifth Army as it advanced north and enemy forces withdrew north of Rome. They were stationed near Florence until the end of the war.

The squadron was returned to the United States at Drew Field, Florida in August 1945.  Most personnel were demobilized although the unit remained active until being inactivated in Oklahoma in November 1945.

District of Columbia Air National Guard
The wartime 121st Liaison Squadron was redesignated as the 121st Fighter Squadron, and was allotted to the District of Columbia Air National Guard, on 24 May 1946. It was organized at Andrews Field, Maryland, and was extended federal recognition on 20 October 1946 by the National Guard Bureau.  The squadron was equipped with P-47D Thunderbolts and was assigned to 113th Fighter Group, also a DC guard unit and was initially gained by Air Defense Command.

The mission of the 121st Fighter Squadron was the air defense of the District of Columbia, along with southern Maryland and northern Virginia. Parts were no problem and many of the maintenance personnel were World War II veterans so readiness was quite high and the planes were often much better maintained than their USAF counterparts. In some ways, the postwar Air National Guard was almost like a flying country club and a pilot could often show up at the field, check out an aircraft and go flying. However, the unit also had regular military exercises that kept up proficiency and in gunnery and bombing contests they would often score at least as well or better than active-duty USAF units, given the fact that most ANG pilots were World War II combat veterans.

In December 1949 the 121st Fighter Squadron converted from its P-47s to F-84C Thunderjets as the first Air National Guard squadron to be equipped with jet aircraft. It was not to be a happy relationship. During 1950, the 121st had lost four Thunderjets in accidents, and two more to undetermined other causes.

On 30 August 1950 the squadron lost a single Republic F-84 Thunderjet during a routine weather training mission of two aircraft.  After passing southbound near Gettysburg, Pennsylvania, the F-84C exploded in mid-air at tree height, left a large crater in a field, and scattered wreckage over 3 acres (1.2 hectares) of the Hilbert cornfield near the Maryland intersection of the Harney and Bollinger School roads.  Along with small parts of the aircraft, a few remains of the pilot were recovered; and the element leader in the lead F-84, 1st Lt. William L. Hall, reported "Alkire had not radioed of any difficulty before the explosion."

Korean War activation

With the surprise invasion of South Korea on 25 June 1950, and the regular military's lack of readiness, most of the Air National Guard was called to active duty, including the 121st, which was activated on 1 February 1951.  The 121st Fighter Squadron became an element of Air Defense Command (ADC) and was redesignated as the 121st Fighter-Interceptor Squadron. The squadron was joined in the 113th Fighter-Interceptor Group by the Delaware ANG 142d Fighter-Interceptor Squadrons, also equipped with F-84Cs, and the Pennsylvania ANG 148th Fighter Squadron equipped with World War II era F-51D Mustangs at Spaatz Field, Reading.

ADC moved the 113th group and its parent 113th Fighter-Interceptor Wing from Andrews AFB to New Castle Air Force Base, Delaware, where they replaced the 4th Fighter-Interceptor Wing and group, which deployed to the Pacific, but the squadron remained at Andrews. The squadron mission was the air defense of the Delaware Bay and the Delmarva Peninsula.

In September 1951 the squadron converted to airborne interception radar equipped F-94B Starfires with partial all-weather capabilities. ADC's was experiencing difficulty under the existing wing base organizational structure in deploying its fighter squadrons to best advantage. In February 1952, the 113th wing and group were inactivated and replaced by the regional 4710th Defense Wing.  The squadron remained assigned to the wing until it was released from federal service in November 1952 and its mission, personnel, and equipment reassigned to the 95th Fighter-Interceptor Squadron, which activated the same day.

Cold War

With its return to District of Columbia control, the 121st Fighter-Interceptor Squadron was re-equipped with propeller-driven F-51H Mustangs and resumed its air defense mission of Washington, D.C.   It was not until 1954, with the phaseout of the Mustang and the requirement by Air Defense Command that its interceptor squadrons be equipped with jet-powered aircraft that the squadron was upgraded to postwar-era F-86A Sabres that had been refurbished and reconditioned before being received.    In August 1954, the 121st began standing daytime air defense alert at Andrews, placing two aircraft at the end of the runway with pilots in the cockpit from one hour before sunrise until one hour after sunset. This ADC alert lasted each and every day until the end of October 1958

Despite the reconditioning, the F-86A Sabres were weary and required a considerable amount of maintenance to keep in the air.   In 1955, the 113th sent them to storage at Davis-Monthan AFB and received F-86E Sabres from active-duty ADC units that were receiving F-89 Scorpion interceptors.  In 1957, the F-86H was already being phased out of active service with the USAF, being replaced by the F-100 Super Sabre, and  the 121st received F-86H Sabres in late 1957.

In late 1958, the gaining command for the 113th was changed from Air Defense Command to Tactical Air Command (TAC) and the mission of the wing was changed to tactical air support, although the air defense of Washington remained as a secondary mission.  The Sabres were phased out in 1960 with the receipt of relatively new F-100C Super Sabres from active duty units receiving the F-100D model.   The Super Sabre was a major improvement over the F-86H and it gave the wing a major increase in capability as well as it entering the supersonic age.

In January 1968, a new crisis, the seizure of the American ship USS Pueblo by North Korean forces, and again the 113th was called to active duty. The wing was activated to federal service, and its personnel were assigned to Myrtle Beach AFB, South Carolina as a filler unit while the base's permanent unit, the 354th Tactical Fighter Wing was deployed to Kunsan Air Base, South Korea. At Myrtle Beach AFB, the federalized NJ ANG 119th Tactical Fighter Squadron joined the 121st TFS on active duty.   However, not all wing personnel were sent to Myrtle Beach, as personnel were spread throughout the United States, Taiwan, Korea, and South Vietnam.

The 113 TFW returned to Andrews AFB, in June 1969, and transitioned into the F-105D Thunderchief (AKA "Thud") in 1971, receiving Vietnam War veteran aircraft that were being withdrawn from combat.   The 113th was one of four Air National Guard units to receive the F-105.  A very large and complex aircraft, the 113th was fortunate to have many Vietnam Veteran airman in its ranks by 1970 which had F-105 experience.   The Thud was the first USAF supersonic tactical fighter-bomber that was developed from scratch.  All others before it were adaptations of aircraft that had originally been developed as pure fighters.

In December 1974, the 113th Tactical Fighter Group was inactivated, with the 121st TFS being assigned directly to the 113th Tactical Fighter Wing.

In 1981 at the end of its service life, the F-105s were retired, with the 113th TFW receiving F-4D Phantom IIs, again receiving Vietnam War veteran aircraft from active-duty units receiving F-15A and F-16A next-generation fighter aircraft.   With the F-4, the 113th returned to the air defense mission, becoming part of Air Defense, Tactical Air Command (ADTAC), a named unit at the Numbered Air Force echelon of TAC.   ADTAC had taken over the mission of Aerospace Defense Command in 1979 when the command was inactivated; the D.C. Air National Guard using the Phantoms for Washington, D.C. air defense.

The 113th operated the Phantoms throughout the 1980s, retiring the Phantoms at the end of their service life in 1989.  In turn, the 121st FS started receiving F-16A Fighting Falcons in September 1989. These were block 5 and 10 models coming from various regular USAF units converting to more modern F-16C/D models. The Wing retained its air defense and attack mission, however the early block 5 and 10 models really designed to do. In the air defense role these models lacked any BVR capability, limiting them only to close range combat with their gun and Sidewinder missiles. In the attack role these aircraft were able to deploy bombs, but with their smaller stabs the center of gravity of these aircraft was far from ideal making it quite a challenge for the pilots to fly these missions.

The 113th Tactical Fighter Wing was not mobilized during the 1991 Gulf Crisis, remaining in the United States with its air defense mission. D. C. Air National Guard volunteers, however were deployed to CENTAF during the crisis and subsequent combat operations as part of Operation Desert Storm.

Air Combat Command
After the collapse of the Soviet Union in 1990 and Operation Desert Storm, Air Force planners reorganized the major command structure and the organization of its units to reflect the new reality of the 1990s and also a smaller force after the end of the Cold War.  Tactical Air Command was replaced by Air Combat Command (ACC) as the gaining command for the 113th effective 1 June 1992.  On 15 March 1992, the 113th adopted the new Air Force Objective Organization, which re-designated the wing as the 113th Fighter Wing.  The 113th Tactical Fighter Group was reactivated as the 113th Operations Group, and the 121st Fighter Squadron was transferred to the 113th OG.  Other support groups under the Objective Wing organization are the 179th Maintenance Group, 179th Mission Support Group and the 179th Medical Group.

In 1994 the 121st traded its early F-16A aircraft for Block 30 F-16C/D Fighting Falcon which upgraded its capabilities considerably.   In May 1996, the 121st Fighter Squadron deployed personnel and aircraft to Al Jaber Air Base, Kuwait to support Operation Southern Watch (OSW).  The 121st FS was the first Air National Guard unit to fly OSW. Operation Southern Watch was an operation which was responsible for enforcing the United Nations mandated no-fly zone below the 32nd parallel north in Iraq. This mission was initiated mainly to cover for attacks of Iraqi forces on the Iraqi Shi’ite Muslims. In July 1996, the squadron returned to Andrews AFB.

In mid-1996, the Air Force, in response to budget cuts, and changing world situations, began experimenting with Air Expeditionary organizations. The Air Expeditionary Force (AEF) concept was developed that would mix Active-Duty, Reserve and Air National Guard elements into a combined force. Instead of entire permanent units deploying as "Provisional" as in the 1991 Gulf War, Expeditionary units are composed of "aviation packages" from several wings, including active-duty Air Force, the Air Force Reserve Command and the Air National Guard, would be married together to carry out the assigned deployment rotation.

In February 1997 the 121st Expeditionary Fighter Squadron (121st EFS) was first formed from 113th personnel and aircraft and deployed to Incirlik Air Base, Turkey in support of Operation Northern Watch (ONW).  Operation Northern Watch was a US European Command Combined Task Force (CTF) who was responsible for enforcing the United Nations mandated no-fly zone above the 36th parallel north in Iraq. This mission was a successor to Operation Provide Comfort which also entailed support for the Iraqi Kurds.  The 121st EFS returned to Andrews in April 1997.  The 121st EFS was again formed in January 1998 when the Wing was tasked with a second Operation Northern Watch deployment to Incirlik Air Base.  This time the deployment was only for a month with less than 100 personnel being deployed.

On 11 September 2001, the wing was given authorization to shoot down threatening aircraft over Washington, D.C.

After the events of 11 September 2001 the squadron took on an Air Sovereignty Alert Detachment role, stationing a number of aircraft at air force bases around the country to fly alert missions as part of Operation Noble Eagle (ONE).

During one of those missions, on 11 May 2005 the squadron scrambled to intercept an aircraft that wandered into the no-fly zone around the White House. Customs officials had also scrambled a Sikorsky UH-60 Black Hawk helicopter and a UC-35B Cessna Citation jet at 11:47 a.m. to intercept the plane. The Customs aircraft gave way when the F-16s arrived flew on the wing tips of the little plane. They dipped their wings – a pilot's signal to 'follow me' – and tried to raise the pilot on the radio. But the Cessna didn't change course and it was flying too slow for the F-16s. The frustrated pilots had to take turns dropping flares, breaking away and returning to drop more flares. One senior Bush administration counter-terrorism official said it was 'a real finger-biting period' because they came very close to ordering a shot against a general aircraft. Finally, when the Cessna came within three miles of the White House – just a few minutes flying time – it altered course.

In its 2005 BRAC Recommendations, the DoD recommended that Cannon Air Force Base, NM be closed. As a result, it would distribute the 27th Fighter Wing’s F-16s to the 113th Wing, Andrews Air Force Base, MD (nine aircraft) and several other installations. The committee claimed that this move would sustain the active/Air National Guard/Air Force Reserve force mix by replacing aircraft that retire in the 2025 Force Structure Plan. However, the base was temporarily removed from closure 26 August 2005, pending review of new mission assignment.

On 6 May 2008 the squadron flew its 2000th scramble since the events of 11 September 2001. Most scrambles do not lead to such stories as noted above.

The 121st Expeditionary Fighter Squadron has been formed and deployed numerous times as part of the Global War on Terrorism.    Supporting Operation Iraqi Freedom (OIF), the 121st EFS deployed to Balad Air Base, Iraq, in 2003, 2007 and 2010.   A deployment to Bagram Air Base, Afghanistan in support of Operation Enduring Freedom (OEF) was made between October 2011 and January 2012.

Lineage
 Constituted as the 121st Observation Squadron in the National Guard 30 July 1940 and allotted to the District of Columbia
 Organized and Federally recognized on 10 April 1941
 Ordered to active service on 1 September 1941
 Redesignated 121st Observation Squadron (Light)' on 13 January 1942
 Redesignated 121st Observation Squadron on 4 July 1942
 Inactivated on 18 October 1942
 Redesignated 121st Liaison Squadron on 2 April 1943
 Activated on 30 April 1943
 Inactivated on 7 November 1945
 Redesignated- 121st Fighter Squadron, Single Engine and allotted to District of Columbia National Guard on 24 May 1946
 Extended federal recognition on 26 October 1946
 Redesignated 121st Fighter Squadron, Jet in December 1949
 Federalized and ordered to active service on: 1 February 1951
 Redesignated 121st Fighter-Interceptor Squadron on 1 February 1951
 Released from active duty and returned to District of Columbia control, 1 November 1952
 Redesignated 121st Tactical Fighter Squadron on 1 November 1958
 Federalized and ordered to active service on: 26 January 1968
 Released from active duty and returned to District of Columbia control, 18 June 1969
 Redesignated 121st Fighter Squadron on 15 March 1993
 Components designated as 121st Expeditionary Fighter Squadron when deployed as part of an Air and Space Expeditionary unit after June 1996

Assignments
 District of Columbia National Guard, 10 April 1941
 65th Observation Group, 1 September 1941 – 18 October 1942
 76th Reconnaissance Group, 30 April 1943
 I Air Support Command (later I Tactical Air Division), 11 August 1943
 Army Air Forces, MTO, Mar 1944
 Attached to United States Fifth Army after 30 September 1944
 Two flights assigned to: United States Strategic Air Forces in Europe, 1 November 1944
 Two flights assigned to: Ninth Air Force, 29 November 1944
 Two flights assigned to: First Tactical Air Force [Prov], 22 December 1944 – 1 March 1945
 Further attached to: Sixth United States Army Group, Sep 1944-1 Mar 1945
 Twelfth Air Force, 25 February 1945
 Attached to: United States Fifth Army to c. July 1945
 Third Air Force, 25 Aug-7 Nov 1945
 113th Fighter Group (later 113th Fighter-Interceptor Group), 24 May 1946
 4710th Defense Wing, 6 February 1952
 113th 113th Fighter-Interceptor Group (later 113th Tactical Fighter Group), 1 November 1958
 113th Tactical Fighter Wing, 9 December 1974
 113th Operations Group, 15 March 1992 – Present

Stations

 743 14th Street, NW, Washington, D.C., 10 April 1941
 Bolling Field, Washington, D.C., 1 September 1941
 Owens Field, South Carolina, 23 September 1941
 Lexington County Airport, South Carolina, 8 December 1941
 Langley Field, Virginia, 26 December 1941
 Birmingham Army Airfield, Alabama, 18 October 1942
 Vichy Army Airfield, Missouri, 30 April 1943
 Morris Field, North Carolina, 8 May 1943
 Raleigh-Durham Army Airfield, North Carolina, 27 August 1943 – 18 February 1944
 Oran Tafraoui Airport, Algeria, 20 March 1944
 Telergma Airport, Algeria, 17 Apr-9 Jul 1944
 Pomigliano Airfield, Italy, 24 July 1944
 A flight located at: St Tropez, France, 1 September 1944
 A flight located at: Lyons, France 15 September 1944
 A flight located at: Vittel, France, 3 October 1944 – 1 March 1945
 D flight located at: Vittel, France, 7 October 1944 – 1 March 1945
 Other flights at various points in Italy during period Sep 1944 – May 1945
 Peretola Airport, Florence, Italy, 6 October 1944
 Verona Airfield, Italy, 3 May 1945
 Manerba Airfield, Italy, 16 May 1945
 Peretola Airport, Florence, Italy, 16 Jul–Aug 1945
 Drew Field, Florida, 25 August 1945
 Muskogee Army Airfield, Oklahoma, 13 Sep-17 Nov 1945
 Andrews Army Airfield, 20 October 1946
 Renamed: Andrews Air Force Base, 24 June 1948
 Renamed: Joint Base Andrews, 1 October 2009 – present

District of Columbia National Guard Deployments

 Korean War
 Operated from: New Castle County AFB, Delaware, 1 February 1951 – 1 November 1952
 1968 Pueblo Crisis
 Operated from: Myrtle Beach AFB, South Carolina, 26 January 1968 – 18 June 1969
 Operation Southern Watch
 Al Jaber Air Base, Kuwait, May–July 1996
 Operation Northern Watch (AEF)
 Incirlik Air Base, Turkey, February–April 1987
 Incirlik Air Base, Turkey, 11 January-6 February 1998
 Operation Iraqi Freedom (AEF)
 Balad Air Base, Iraq, March-29 April 2003
 Balad Air Base, Iraq, August–October 2007
 Balad Air Base, Iraq, January–April 2010
 Operation Enduring Freedom (AEF)
 Bagram Air Base, Afghanistan, 7 October 2011 – January 2012
 Operation Inherent Resolve, Operation Spartan Shield, Operation Enduring Freedom (AEF)
 Prince Sultan Air Base, Saudi Arabia, July 2021 - October 2021

Aircraft

 Douglas O-38, 1941–1942
 North American O-47, 1941–1942
 Curtiss O-52 Owl, 1941–1942
 L-4 Grasshopper, 1943–1944
 L-5 Sentinel, 1943–1944
 L-6 Grasshopper, 1943–1944
 RA-24 Banshee, 1943–1944
 A-20 Havoc, 1944–1945
 UC-78 Bobcat, 1945
 P-47D Thunderbolt, 1947–1949
 F-84C Thunderjet, 1949–1951
 F-94B Starfire, 1951–1952
 F-51H Mustang, 1952–1954
 F-86A Sabre, 1954–1955
 F-86E Sabre, 1955–1957
 F-86H Sabre, 1957–1960
 F-100C/F Super Sabre, 1960–1971
 F-105D/F Thunderchief, 1971–1982
 F-4D Phantom II, 1981–1990
 Block 5/10 F-16A Fighting Falcon, 1989–1994
 Block 30 F-16C/D Fighting Falcon, 1994 – present

See also

 List of observation squadrons of the United States Army National Guard

References

Notes

Bibliography

 
 
 Grant, C.L., (1961)  The Development of Continental Air Defense to 1 September 1954, USAF Historical Study No. 126
 
 
 
 Rogers, B. (2006). United States Air Force Unit Designations Since 1978. 
 121st Fighter Squadron lineage and history
  Cornett, Lloyd H. and Johnson, Mildred W., A Handbook of Aerospace Defense Organization  1946 – 1980, Office of History, Aerospace Defense Center, Peterson AFB, CO (1980).
 McLaren, David (2004), Lockheed P-80/F-80 Shooting Star: A Photo Chronicle, Schiffer Publishing, Ltd.; First Edition, 
 McLaren, David. Republic F-84 Thunderjet, Thunderstreak & Thunderflash: A Photo Chronicle. Atglen, PA: Schiffer Military/Aviation History, 1998. .

Sources

External links

 http://www.globalsecurity.org/military/agency/usaf/121fs.htm

Squadrons of the United States Air National Guard
Fighter squadrons of the United States Air Force
Military units and formations in Maryland